Wreford is a name originating in Devon, England. It may refer to:

Wreford, Kansas, United States
Rural Municipality of Wreford No. 280, Saskatchewan, Canada

People with the surname
Catherine Wreford (born 1980), Canadian actor
Edgar Wreford (1923–2006), English actor
Lorraine Wreford (born 1961), Australian politician

See also
 Wreford-Brown, a surname
 Reford (disambiguation)

English-language surnames